This is a list of musical compositions that employ extended techniques to obtain unusual sounds or instrumental timbres.
Hector Berlioz
"Dream of Witches' Sabbath" from Symphonie Fantastique. The violins and violas play col legno, striking the wood of their bows on the strings .
 Heinrich Ignaz Franz von Biber
Battalia (1673). The strings play col legno, striking the wood of their bows on the strings, in addition to numerous other techniques .
François-Adrien Boieldieu
Le calife de Bagdad (opera, 1800), strings play col legno .
Benjamin Britten
Passacaglia from Peter Grimes, rehearsal 6, "agitato", (pp. 16–17 of the score). The violins and violas play col legno, striking the wood of their bows on the strings .
John Cage
prepared piano pieces (1938)
Nicolas-Marie Dalayrac
Une heure de mariage (opera, 1804). Strings use col legno .
Pascal Dusapin
Watt, concerto for trombone and orchestra (1994). Features "ample use of extended techniques" .
Carlo Farina
Capriccio stravagante (from Ander Theil newer Paduanen, Gagliarden, Couranten, französischen Arien, 1627). The violins play glissando, pizzicato, tremolo, and in double stops, and use particular effects such as col legno (striking the wood of the bow on the strings) and sul ponticello (bowing close to the bridge), in order to imitate the sounds of a cat, a dog, a hen, the lyre, clarino trumpet, military drum, Spanish guitar, etc..
Tobias Hume
"Harke, Harke", from First Part of Ayres (1605). The viol da gamba plays col legno, with the instruction "Drum this with the back of your Bow".
Charles Ives
Concord Sonata, use of a  piece of wood to create a cluster chord in the "Hawthorne" movement .
Helmut Lachenmann
After TemA (1968), almost all works make extensive use of extended techniques .
Gustav Mahler
Symphony No. 1 in D major, third movement (p. 91 of the UE score) first violins, divisi a 3, play col legno tratto, stroking the strings with the wood of their bows .
Symphony No. 2 in D major, first movement, bars 304–306, all the strings play col legno (some of the strings continue through 307), striking the wood of their bows on the strings .
Camille Saint-Saëns
Danse macabre, the strings play col legno to suggest the rattling of skeletons 
Arnold Schoenberg
Gurrelieder (1911), makes use of Sprechstimme 
Die glückliche Hand (1910–1913), makes use of Sprechstimme 
Pierrot Lunaire Op. 21 (1912) makes use of Sprechstimme 
Moses und Aron (1930–1932), makes use of Sprechstimme 
String Quartet No. 4, op. 37 (1936). Fourth movement (Allegro), bars 882–888, all four instruments play  col legno battuto, col legno tratto, and col legno tratto ponticello, on single notes and in double stops, tremolo, and in harmonics .
String Trio, op. 45 (1946). The violin and cello play col legno battuto; the violin plays col legno tratto in double stops; all the instruments play col legno tratto ponticello, double stops; violin and viola play col legno tratto ponticello in double stops, which are also played tremolo
Igor Stravinsky
The Firebird, the strings occasionally play col legno, striking the wood of their bows on the strings 
Heitor Villa-Lobos
Assobio a játo (1950), requires the flute to play "imitando fischi in toni ascendenti" (imitating whistles in rising tones), accomplished by blowing into the embouchure  "as if one were warming up the instrument on a cold day" .
Chôros No. 8 (1925), for orchestra and two pianos, requires one or both of the pianos to insert paper between the strings for a passage .

References

External links
 Carlo Forlivesi Official Website
 Panayiotis Kokoras' home page

 
Extended techniques